Johann Baptist Dallinger von Dalling (1782–1868) was an Austrian painter.

A son of Johann Dallinger von Dalling, he was born in Vienna, and painted landscapes and animals in the old Dutch
style, as well as portraits and conversation-pieces. Some of his works are in the Belvedere and Liechtenstein Galleries. He died at Vienna in 1868.

References
 

1782 births
1868 deaths
19th-century Austrian painters
19th-century Austrian male artists
Austrian male painters
Artists from Vienna